Langton is a village and civil parish in the Ryedale district of North Yorkshire, England. Until 1974 the village lay in the historic county boundaries of the East Riding of Yorkshire. The population at the 2011 Census was less than 100. Details are included in the civil parish of Birdsall, North Yorkshire.

Langton Hall was the home of Woodleigh School, an independent preparatory school founded in 1929 by the educationalist Arthur England, from 1946 until the school's closure in 2012. There is also a small state primary school, Langton Community School with around 80 pupils.

The village was historically the seat of the Norcliffe family. Their former home, Langton Hall, previously owned by their descendants, the Howard-Vyse family, and leased to Woodleigh School until 2012, is a Grade II listed building.

Langton Hall was purchased by William Langton in 2019 (namesake coincidence), who has undertaken a full restoration of the "decaying country pile after falling for its charms".

In 1823 Langton was a civil parish in the East Riding of Yorkshire, and the Wapentake of Buckrose. The parish church, dedicated to St Andrew, and the parish living was under the patronage of the King. Population at the time was 280. Occupations included five farmers, two grocers, a tailor & draper, a butcher, a shoemaker, a schoolmaster, a parish constable, and the landlord of Horse Shoes  public house who was also a blacksmith. A Major and Mrs Northcliffe were resident at the Hall.

References

External links

Villages in North Yorkshire
Civil parishes in North Yorkshire